Hawkins Island is an island in the northern part of the Gulf of Alaska in the state of Alaska, United States. It lies just west of the city of Cordova, between that city and the further offshore Hinchinbrook Island. Prince William Sound lies to the north side of the island, while Orca Inlet and the main body of the Gulf of Alaska lie to its south. Hawkins Island has a land area of 176.388 km2 (68.1039 sq mi) and a population of four persons was reported as of the 2000 census.

References
United States Geological Survey, Geographic names identification system Feature Detail Report for Hawkins Island
Hawkins Island: Block 1172, Census Tract 2, Valdez-Cordova Census Area, Alaska United States Census Bureau

Islands of Alaska
Islands of Chugach Census Area, Alaska
Islands of Unorganized Borough, Alaska